The Ethnographic Museum of Pyrsogianni is a museum in the village Pyrsogianni, in the Mastorochoria area, in the Ioannina regional unit, Greece. It focuses on traditional stone masonry, and displays photographs, drawings, plans and tools.

External links
www.arafura.net.au
www.michelisfoundation.gr (see #4)
www.epcon.gr (in Greek)
walking-greece.ana-mpa.gr (in Greek)
www.hri.org (in Greek)

References

Ethnographic museums in Greece
Museums in Ioannina (regional unit)